Dundressan is a townland of 255 acres in County Antrim, Northern Ireland. It is situated in the civil parish of Islandmagee and the historic barony of Belfast Lower.

See also 
List of townlands in County Antrim

References

Townlands of County Antrim
Civil parish of Island Magee